The Bandai Mega controller is a programmable unit released in 1987 and officially licensed by Nintendo for play on the Nintendo Entertainment System. It includes a built in LCD screen that displays the active functions, and a built in game.

The modes included are:

This controller was also released for the Nintendo Famicom with the name Super Controller 2.

References

Nintendo Entertainment System accessories